Sistema Ox Bel Ha (from Mayan meaning "Three Paths of Water"; short Ox Bel Ha) is a cave system in Quintana Roo, Mexico. It is the longest explored underwater cave in the world and ranks second including dry caves. There are more than 150 cenotes in the system.

Discoveries
The Naranjal subsystem is part of Sistema Ox Bel Ha. Three prehistoric human remains have been found within the subsystem. The Jailhouse cenote, or Las Palmas, is the entrance to the locations of the Muknal and Las Palmas caves. The Muknal cave, part of the Naranjal subsystem, contained the remains of a 40 to 50-year-old man, the Muknal Grandfather (9,600 cal BP). Unlike the other two skeletons in the subsystem, the Muknal Grandfather shows evidence of secondary burial. Analysis of these skeletons suggests that Ox Bel Ha was likely used as an important site for ritual burial. 

A new genus and species of extinct peccary, Muknalia minima, was identified from a fossil mandible found in the Muknal cave of the Ox Bel Ha system. However, it was subsequently recognised that this was a junior synonym of the collared peccary.

See also
List of caves in Mexico
List of longest caves

References

External links
Mexico’s Yucatan Peninsula Reveals a Cryptic Methane-Fueled Ecosystem in Flooded Caves USGS

Sistema Sac Actun and Sistema Dos Ojos
Caves of Mexico
Landforms of Quintana Roo
Limestone caves
Natural history of Quintana Roo
Sinkholes of Mexico
Tulum (municipality)
Tourist attractions in Quintana Roo
Underwater diving sites in Mexico